Wilf Carter may refer to:

 Wilf Carter (footballer) (1933–2013), English footballer
 Wilf Carter (musician) (1904–1996), also known as Montana Slim, Canadian singer-songwriter

See also
 Wilfred Carter, (1896–1975) English footballer